Zia Inayat-Khan (born 1971) is a scholar and teacher of Sufism in the lineage of his grandfather, Inayat Khan.  He is president of the Inayati Order and founder of Suluk Academy, a school of contemplative study with branches in the United States and Europe.

Biography 
Zia Inayat-Khan was born in Novato, California, in 1971, and is the first son of Sufi teachers Vilayat Inayat Khan and Murshida Taj Inayat. Vilayat made it clear to Zia at an early age that he wished him to take the mantle of his Sufi lineage as passed down from Inayat Khan, and instructed him in meditation and spiritual retreat. Zia was confirmed as spiritual successor to Vilayat in 2000, and has served as head of the Inayati Order, guiding Inayati communities in North and South America, Europe, the Middle East, Asia, and the South Pacific.

Works 
Zia has lectured and taught extensively throughout the United States, Europe, and India on Sufism and its relevance to personal and collective transformation. Zia has specialized in carrying forward and teaching the spiritual legacy of his grandfather, Inayat Khan. Zia's writings and talks also focus on connecting the heritage of contemplative wisdom traditions with contemporary society, with an emphasis on responding to crucial ecological and social challenges.

Publications 
Pearl in Wine: Essays on the Life, Music and Sufism of Hazrat Inayat Khan, ed. Zia Inayat Khan (2001)
 Saracen Chivalry: Counsels on Valor, Generosity and the Mystical Quest (2012)
 Caravan of Souls: An Introduction to the Sufi Path of Hazrat Inayat Khan (2013)
 “Persian and Indian Visions of the Living Earth," in Spiritual Ecology: The Cry of the Earth, ed. Llewellyn Vaughan-Lee (2013)
 "The Seed of Love", in Sacred Seed, A Collection of Essays, ed. Global Peace Initiative of Women (2014).
Ritterliche Tugenden im Alten Orient - Edelmut, Tapferkeit und mystische Suche(Verlag Heilbronn 2016)
Bird Language - Aphorisms in 7 Languages (Verlag Heilbronn 2017)
Mingled Waters: Sufism and the Mystical Unity of Religions (2017)
Ritterschaft des Herzens – 40 Regeln für ein aufrechtes Leben (Verlag Heilbronn 2021, gebunden, ISBN 978-3-936246-46-9)

Audio 
The Inayati Order Digital Media by Pir Zia Inayat Khan
The Inayati Order Soundcloud

Video 
Pir Zia Inayat Khan on Youtube
Pir Zia Inayat Khan webcasts on Vimeo

References 

1971 births
Living people
American Sufis
American Universalists
Chishtis
Ināyati Sufis
People from Novato, California
Writers from California